Wiens Peak is a peak in Antarctica at the east end of Elliott Ridge in southern Neptune Range, Pensacola Mountains. It was mapped by the United States Geological Survey (USGS) from surveys and U.S. Navy air photos from 1956 to 1966. It was named by the Advisory Committee on Antarctic Names (US-ACAN) for Rudolph H. Wiens, an aurora scientist at Ellsworth Station during the winter of 1962.

Mountains of Queen Elizabeth Land
Pensacola Mountains